The Galpin Society was formed in October 1946 to further research into the branch of musicology known as organology, i.e. the history, construction, development and use of musical instruments. Based in the United Kingdom, it is named after the eminent British organologist and musical instrument collector, Canon Francis William Galpin (1858–1945), who had a lifelong interest in studying, collecting, playing, making and writing about musical instruments.

The society's founder members, from the generation who followed in the footsteps of Canon Galpin, were keen to form a society to promote the historical study of all kinds of musical instruments. They included Anthony Baines, Robert Donington, Hugh Gough, Eric Halfpenny, Edgar Hunt, Eric Marshall Johnson, Lyndesay Langwill, Reginald Morley-Pegge, Geoffrey Rendall and Maurice Vincent. Philip Bate was the inaugural chairman of the society and Professor Jack Westrup, Heather Professor of Music at the University of Oxford, served as its first president.

These names represented a contemporary roll-call of academic figures, professional and amateur performers and private collectors, enthusiastically following the pioneering activities of Canon Galpin and bringing the relatively unknown term organology, coined in 1941 by Nicholas Bessaraboff, to the attention of a wider public. The society's exhibition of 330 British-made instruments at the Arts Council's premises in St James's Square for the 1951 Festival of Britain was a triumph of efficient organisation. It brought together a "collection unsurpassed in its representative completeness" (Gerald Hayes, GSJ VI 1953) which attracted over 6000 visitors.

The Galpin Society Journal quickly established itself as the forum for academics, makers, players and collectors to publish their research and it remains the leading academic journal in the field of organology in the UK. A complete list of journals is provided on the website and all journals up to five years prior to the current year can be accessed via the JSTOR website by anyone with access to an institution that subscribes to it, or on a pay-per-view basis. Individual Galpin Society members are entitled to a 50% discount on JPASS (a 1-year access plan).

Today the Galpin Society has an international membership that includes many educational institutions as well as individuals from all walks of life. It arranges occasional conferences and visits, often in conjunction with other societies or academic institutions with similar interests. The society publishes a newsletter on the website three times a year, which includes reviews of museum exhibitions, events, recent publications of books on musical instruments, requests for information and other articles contributed by members.

External links
The Galpin Society
The American Musical Instrument Society

Music organizations
Organology